Epifanio G. Matute was a Filipino playwright.

Biography 
Epifanio G. Matute was a reporter for Mabuhay under MSCD (Debate, Monday Mall, Herald, Mabuhay). He was an editor for Sampaguita, Mabuhay and Pagsilang. He also contributed to Liwayway and Malaya. His play, Kuwentong Kutsero, is his most famous work, and he became a leading Philippines' playwright under Narciso Pimentel Jr.'s direction.

References 

Year of birth missing (living people)
Filipino dramatists and playwrights
Filipino writers
Living people